The Order of Freedom is one of the badges of honor in Iran, established by "Council of Iran Ministers" on November 21, 1990. The order is awarded by President of Iran. According to the Article 4 of the Regulations on the Awarding of Government Orders of Iran, the Order of Freedom is awarded to persons who hold one of the first order of General or Expertise awards and continue to be qualified to serve the sacred aims of the Islamic system.

Details
The Order of Freedom is one of the Iran Excellence awards. The order has only one grade and is awarded a maximum of 8 in each term of president office.

Advantages
According to the Article 22 of the Regulations on the Awarding of Government Orders of Iran (approved on November 21, 1990 and modified on December 26, 2001) the advantages of receiving the Order of Freedom are as follows:
 Material advantages
 Donate 200 Bahar Azadi Coin to the recipients
 Immaterial advantages
 Attending formal ceremonies and rituals
 Publish name and profile of order holders in periodic collections
 Installation of image and memorial plaque in recipients municipality of birthplace or institution and place of service
 Priority in studying opportunities and getting the facilities needed to carry out research and investigation projects

See also
 Order of Altruism
 Order of Work and Production
 Order of Research
 Order of Mehr
 Order of Justice (Iran)
 Order of Construction
 Order of Knowledge
 Order of Education and Pedagogy
 Order of Persian Politeness
 Order of Independence (Iran)
 Order of Service
 Order of Courage (Iran)
 Order of Culture and Art
 Order of Merit and Management

References

External links
 Iran Awarding of Government Orders website
 Types of Iran's badges and their benefits

Awards established in 1990
Civil awards and decorations of Iran
1990 establishments in Iran